Diadelia laterimaculata is a species of beetle in the family Cerambycidae. It was described by the entomologist Stephan von Breuning in 1943.

References

Diadelia
Beetles described in 1943